Yegor Sergeyevich Ushakov (born 2 December 2002) is a Russian football player who plays for PFC CSKA Moscow.

Club career
He made his debut in the Russian Premier League for PFC CSKA Moscow on 3 April 2022 in a game against FC Ural Yekaterinburg. He made his first start and scored his first goal in CSKA's next game on 9 April against FC Khimki.

On 20 May 2022, Ushakov signed a new four-year contract with CSKA.

Career statistics

References

External links
 
 
 

2002 births
Living people
Russian footballers
Russia youth international footballers
Russia under-21 international footballers
Association football forwards
PFC CSKA Moscow players
Russian Premier League players